Na Klang may refer to:
Na Klang District in Nongbua Lamphu Province, Thailand
Na Klang, Nakhon Ratchasima, subdistrict of Sung Noen District, Nakhon Ratchasima, Thailand
Na Klang, Nakhon Sawan, subdistrict of Krok Phra District, Nakhon Sawan, Thailand

See also 
Na Kang, subdistrict in Pak Khat District, Bueng Kan, Thailand
List of tambon in Thailand (N–O)